Thames Valley College of Business & IT, also known as Information Technology Business College Inc., is a private career college in London, Ontario, Canada. It reportedly opened in 2003 and is accredited by the Ministry of Training, Colleges and Universities, under the Private Career Colleges Act of Ontario. Some references indicate that Information Technology Business College was operational earlier than 2003.

Thames Valley College offers the following accredited Diploma Programs:

Accounting & Payroll Administrator,
Marketing Assistant,
Police Foundations,
Medical Office Administrator,
Office Administration,
Information Technology Technician,
Network Administrator,
Network & Internet Security Specialist,
Legal Administrative Assistant,
Computer Business Applications Specialist,
Website Designer (E-Commerce), and
Web Developer (E-Commerce).

Student loan default rates
The Ontario Student Assistance Program reports default rates for private career colleges. For Thames Valley College, the percentage of student loans in default was 35.3% in 2005 and 41.7% in 2004, compared to 22.2% and 25.4% for all private career colleges.

References

Strategis: Canadian Company profiles -  Thames Valley College
Thames Valley College
Vocational education in Canada
Education in London, Ontario
2003 establishments in Ontario